Russell Mardon Viner,  FMedSci (born 1963) is an Australian-British paediatrician, data scientist, policy researcher and Professor of Adolescent Health at the UCL Great Ormond Street Institute of Child Health. He is an expert on child and adolescent health in the UK and internationally. He was a member of the UK Government's Scientific Advisory Group for Emergencies (SAGE) during the COVID-19 pandemic (advising on children, young people and schools) and was President of the Royal College of Paediatrics and Child Health from 2018 to 2021. He remains clinically active, seeing young people with diabetes each week at UCL Hospitals. His research focuses on the health of children and young people, from global analyses of social determinants of health and global burden of disease (GBD), through use of ‘big’ routine data in children and young people’s healthcare, to conducting intervention studies both at the school level and clinical interventions in obesity and diabetes.

Education and professional life 
Viner studied medicine at the University of Queensland and then undertook professional training in paediatrics and paediatric endocrinology and diabetes in Brisbane, Australia and in the UK. He undertook a PhD the University of Cambridge in History and Philosophy of Science (1992-96), before moving to London in 1997 to set up the first Adolescent Medicine unit in the UK jointly between Great Ormond St. Hospital and UCL Hospitals. 

He is a Fellow of the Academy of Medical Sciences (FMedSci) and a Fellow of the Royal Australasian College of Physicians (FRACP, 1995), of the Royal College of Paediatrics and Child Health (FRCPCH, 1998) and was awarded a fellowship of the Royal College of Physicians (London) in 2000.  

He us currently named on over £17 million in current research grants, being Chief/Principal Investigator on approximately £8 million, with funding obtained from the National Institute for Health and Care Research (NIHR), the Medical Research Council (MRC), and charities. He was appointed as an NIHR Senior Investigator in 2015. 

Viner has published  over 450 publications ( more than 200 as original research publications and a further 100 other peer-reviewed publications) in international journals. His H-index is 90.

Honours and awards 

 Cambridge Commonwealth Trust PhD Studentship 1993-96.
 Mid Career Fellowship, Health Foundation UK, 2002- 04
 HEFCE Clinical Senior Lecturership Award, 2007-12
 Milroy Lecturer, Royal College of Physicians of London, 2014.
 Dame Elizabeth Murdoch Fellowship 2016, Murdoch Children’s Research Institute, Royal Children’s Hospital & University of Melbourne, Australia.
 Senior Investigator, National Institute of Health Research (NIHR), 2016-current
 Founder's Award, International Association of Adolescent Health, 2017
 Commander of the Most Excellent Order of the British Empire (CBE), awarded in the 2022 New Year's Honours List.

References 

Living people
1963 births
Physicians of University College Hospital
Pediatricians
Alumni of the University of Cambridge
University of Queensland alumni
Commanders of the Order of the British Empire

NIHR Senior Investigators
Fellows of the Royal College of Physicians
Fellows of the Royal Australasian College of Physicians